Pullijärv (also known as Lake Pullipõdra) is a lake on the northwestern side of Misso settlement, in southeastern Estonia.

References

Lakes of Estonia
Rõuge Parish
Lakes of Võru County